Jim Hatfield (born December 28, 1943) is an American former college basketball coach. He was head coach of the Southwestern Louisiana Ragin' Cajuns, Mississippi State Bulldogs and the Hardin–Simmons Cowboys.

Hatfield played at East Tennessee State. Following the close of his college career, he joined the coaching ranks. An assistant at Kentucky from 1972 to 1974, he was hired as head coach of the University of Southern Louisiana (now the University of Louisiana at Lafayette) in 1975. He compiled a record of 47–35 in three seasons and was then hired to coach Mississippi State of the Southeastern Conference (SEC). Hatfield coached three seasons for the Bulldogs, ultimately resigning at the end of the 1980–81 season.

He then coached at Hardin–Simmons for two seasons before returning to Kentucky as an assistant.

References

External links
Division I coaching record

1943 births
Living people
American men's basketball coaches
American men's basketball players
Birmingham–Southern Panthers men's basketball coaches
College men's basketball head coaches in the United States
East Tennessee State Buccaneers men's basketball players
Hardin–Simmons Cowboys basketball coaches
Kentucky Wildcats men's basketball coaches
Louisiana Ragin' Cajuns men's basketball coaches
Mississippi State Bulldogs men's basketball coaches